Shamshad Sattar Bachani is a Pakistani politician who was a member of the National Assembly of Pakistan from 2002 to 2013.

Political career
She was elected to the National Assembly of Pakistan from Constituency NA-223 (Hyderabad-VI) as a candidate of Pakistan Peoples Party (PPP) in 2002 Pakistani general election. She received 50,624 votes and defeated an independent candidate, Adeeba Gul Magsi.

She was re-elected to the National Assembly from Constituency NA-223 (Tando Allahyar-cum-Matiari) as a candidate of PPP in 2008 Pakistani general election. She received 84,669 votes and defeated Adeeba Gul Magsi, a candidate of Pakistan Muslim League (Q) (PML-Q).

References

Living people
Pakistan People's Party politicians
Sindhi people
Pakistani MNAs 2008–2013
Pakistani MNAs 2002–2007
Year of birth missing (living people)